Legislative elections were held in the Republic of Dahomey on 2 April 1959. Although the Dahomeyan Democratic Union (UDD) received the most votes, they won the fewest seats. The Republican Party of Dahomey (PRD), which came second in terms of votes, won 37 of the 70 seats in the Legislative Assembly. Following the election the PRD and UDD agreed to split the seats in one constituency, with the PRD losing nine seats and the UDD gaining nine seats.

Results

References

Elections in Benin
Dahomey
1959 in the Republic of Dahomey
National Assembly (Benin)
Election and referendum articles with incomplete results